Jorge Patiño (born 18 December 1911) was a Peruvian sports shooter. He competed in the 50 m rifle event at the 1936 Summer Olympics.

References

External links
 

1911 births
Year of death missing
Peruvian male sport shooters
Olympic shooters of Peru
Shooters at the 1936 Summer Olympics
Sportspeople from Lima
20th-century Peruvian people